Kijŏng-dong, Kijŏngdong, or Kijŏng tong is a Potemkin village in P'yŏnghwa-ri, Kaesong, North Korea. It is situated in the North's half of the Korean Demilitarized Zone (DMZ). Also known in North Korea as Peace Village, it has been widely referred to as 'Propaganda Village' by those outside North Korea, especially in South Korean and Western media.

History

The North Korean government says the village contains a 200-family collective farm, serviced by a child care center, kindergarten, primary and secondary schools, and a hospital. However, the South says the town is an uninhabited village built in the 1950s in a propaganda effort to encourage South Korean defection and to house the Democratic People's Republic of Korea (DPRK) soldiers manning the network of artillery positions, fortifications and underground marshalling bunkers that surround the border zone.

The village features a number of brightly painted, poured-concrete multi-story buildings and apartments, many apparently wired for electricity. The town was oriented so that the bright blue roofs and white sides of the buildings next to the massive DPRK flag would be the most distinguishing features when viewed from across the border. Scrutiny with modern telescopic lenses, however, has led to the conclusion that the buildings are concrete shells lacking window glass or even interior rooms, with building lights turned on and off at set times and empty sidewalks swept by caretakers in an effort to preserve the illusion of activity.

The village is surrounded by extensive cultivated fields, clearly visible to visitors to the North Korean side of the DMZ.

Flagpole

For over a decade, the flagpole was the tallest supported flagpole in the world. It is now the fifth-tallest supported flagpole in the world.

Propaganda loudspeakers
Massive loudspeakers mounted on several of the buildings deliver DPRK propaganda broadcasts directed towards the South. Originally, the content extolled the North's virtues in great detail and urged disgruntled soldiers and farmers simply to walk across the border to be received as brothers. Eventually, as its value in inducing defections proved minimal, the content was switched to condemnatory anti-Western speeches, agitprop operas, and patriotic marching music for up to 20 hours a day. For a period from 2004 to 2016, both North and South agreed to end their loudspeaker broadcasts at each other. The broadcasts have since resumed after escalating tensions as a result of the January 2016 nuclear test.

See also 
Potemkin village

Notes

References 

Kaesong
Villages in North Korea
Korean Demilitarized Zone
North Hwanghae
Ghost towns in North Korea